Palermo, founded as Hagartown, is a former village in Halton County, Ontario, Canada which has been amalgamated into the town of Oakville.

The village was located around what is now the intersection of Dundas Street and Bronte Road.  The village was established in 1805 by Lawrence Hagar, a settler to Upper Canada from Pennsylvania.  The village was named Hagartown until 1836 when it was renamed to Palermo in honour of Horatio Nelson, Lord of Palermo.

In 1869, the population was 300.  In 1875, the village had an iron foundry, two stores, and a hotel. At that time its population was 150.  By the 1870s, the village also had a wagon shop, blacksmith shop, harness shop, brick school house, churches, a telegraph office and drill shed.  The village was amalgamated with Oakville in 1962, along with Trafalgar Township and other nearby villages.

References

External links
Photo of Store & Post Office at Palermo, L. Hager, General Merchant

Neighbourhoods in Oakville, Ontario
1805 establishments in Upper Canada